Innocent is a 2010 novel by Scott Turow that continues the story of the antagonistic relationship between ex-prosecutor Rožat "Rusty" Sabich and Tommasino "Tommy" Molto as a direct follow-up to his 1987 debut novel, Presumed Innocent. Sabich, now chief judge of the Court of Appeals, is indicted by Molto for the murder of Sabich's wife Barbara; Alejandro "Sandy" Stern returns to defend Sabich. The novel was adapted into a television drama of the same name, starring Bill Pullman as Sabich, which first aired on TNT in November 2011.

Synopsis 
In the opening prologue of Innocent, set in 2008 and narrated by Sabich's son Nat, Rusty has been sitting with his dead wife Barbara for nearly a full day. According to Rusty, she was dead when he woke up in the morning; he believes it was due to natural causes, but complications arise because he had been previously accused of murder in the death of his colleague Carolyn Polhemus twenty-two years ago.

As it turns out, Rusty, who is now the Chief Judge of the State Court of Appeals for the Third Appellate District and celebrated his 60th birthday in 2007, has again had an extramarital affair, this time with his senior law clerk, Anna Vostic. Because Molto, now acting prosecuting attorney for Kindle County, was unable to prove Sabich's guilt in the murder of Polhemus, he is hesitant to pursue Sabich for the death of Barbara, but allows his chief deputy, Jim Brand, to quietly investigate. Eventually, the investigation yields enough evidence to once again indict Sabich for murder, setting up another courtroom confrontation between Molto, Stern, and Sabich.

Reception
Both Kirkus Reviews and Publishers Weekly gave Innocent starred reviews. Kevin J. Hamilton, reviewing for The Seattle Times, called the novel "terrific" and praised Turow as "by far the best courtroom novelist of our time", but added "Turow glosses over the [character] detail and the novel suffers for it".

Adaptation
The novel was adapted into a teleplay as the debut entry in the TNT Tuesday Night Mystery movie, which aired on November 29, 2011.

References

External links
 
 
 

Kindle County
2010 American novels
Adultery in novels
Novels by Scott Turow
Legal thriller novels
American novels adapted into films
Fiction set in 2008